Charles Gardner Mallonee (October 8, 1903 – November 14, 1980) was an American college football and lacrosse player and coach. He served as the head football coach at Johns Hopkins University from 1936 to 1945. As a college athlete, he competed in the 1928 Summer Olympics on United States lacrosse team.

References

1903 births
1980 deaths
American football ends
American lacrosse players
Basketball coaches from Maryland
Johns Hopkins Blue Jays football coaches
Johns Hopkins Blue Jays football players
Johns Hopkins Blue Jays men's basketball coaches
Johns Hopkins Blue Jays men's lacrosse players
Lacrosse players at the 1928 Summer Olympics
Olympic lacrosse players of the United States
Lacrosse players from Baltimore
Players of American football from Baltimore